Joseph Ernest Olivier (January 6, 1844 – January 26, 1914) was a French entomologist and botanist, known as a specialist in fireflies (Lampyridae). As of 1888 he was founder and editor of the journal Revue scientifique du Bourbonnais et du centre de la France. He was also involved in politics, serving as town councilor and later mayor of Chemilly, Allier, and was founder of the Gazette de l'Allier newspaper. He was a member of the Entomological Society of France and the Entomological Society of London. He was the grandson of entomologist Guillaume-Antoine Olivier. His botanical works include Flore populaire de l'Allier.

In his last years of life, Olivier was a member of the Friends of the Natural History Museum Paris, founded 1907.

In 1922, thus eight years after Olivier's death, the editorial board of the journal Revue scientifique du Bourbonnais founded the "Bourbonnais Scientific Society for the Study and Protection of Nature" (Société scientifique du Bourbonnais pour l'étude et la protection de la nature). Both the Journal and the Society still exist in the present day.

References

External links
 
 Works by Ernest Olivier at Biodiversity Heritage Library

1844 births
1914 deaths
French entomologists
19th-century French botanists
Coleopterists
People from Moulins, Allier
Academic journal editors
20th-century French botanists